The Tweed Valley Adventist College is an independent Seventh-day Adventist co-educational primary and secondary day school, located in Murwillumbah, a town on the Tweed Coast below Mt Warning in New South Wales, Australia.

See also

List of schools in Northern Rivers and Mid North Coast
List of Seventh-day Adventist secondary schools
 Seventh-day Adventist education

References

External links 

K-12 schools
Private secondary schools in New South Wales
Private primary schools in New South Wales
Educational institutions established in 1900
Education in Tweed Heads, New South Wales
Adventist secondary schools in Australia
Adventist primary schools in Australia
1900 establishments in Australia